Special input/output (Special I/O or SIO) are inputs and/or outputs of a microcontroller designated to perform specialized functions or have specialized features. 

Specialized functions can include:
Hardware interrupts,
analog input or output
PWM output
Serial communication, such as UART, USART, SPI bus, or SerDes.
External reset
Switch debounce
Input pull-up (or -down) resistors
 open collector output

Some kinds of special I/O functions can sometimes be emulated with general-purpose input/output and bit banging software.

See also

Atari SIO

References

Computer buses
Integrated circuits